The 1983 FIBA World Championship for Women (Portuguese: Campeonato Mundial Feminino Fiba de 1983) was hosted by Brazil from July 24 to August 6, 1983. The Soviet Union won the tournament, defeating the United States 84–82 in the final.

Venues

Participating nations

Squads

Preliminary round 
The top two teams in each group advance to the semifinal round, while the bottom two teams played in the classification round.

Group A

Group B

Group C

Classification round 

|}
Source: FIBA Archives

Semifinal round 
The United States qualified for the semifinal round by the virtue of winning the previous world championship, while Brazil qualified as hosts. A total of 25 matches were played in the semifinal round.

Medal games

Bronze-medal match

Final

Final standings

Awards

References
Results

FIBA Women's Basketball World Cup
FIBA
FIBA
FIBA
July 1983 sports events in South America
August 1983 sports events in South America